The Philippine Senate Committee on Rules is a standing committee of the Senate of the Philippines.

Its chairperson is the Senate Majority Floor Leader, and its vice chairperson is the Assistant Majority Leader.

Jurisdiction 
The committee handles all matters affecting the Rules of the Senate, the calendar as well as parliamentary rules and the order and manner of transacting business, and the creation of committees.

Members, 18th Congress 
Based on the Rules of the Senate, the Senate Committee on Rules has 9 members.

The President Pro Tempore and the Minority Floor Leader are ex officio members.

Here are the members of the committee in the 18th Congress as of September 24, 2020:

Committee secretary: Ma. Lourdes A. Juan-Alzate

See also 

 List of Philippine Senate committees

References 

Rules